Homology may refer to:

Sciences

Biology 

Homology (biology), any characteristic of biological organisms that is derived from a common ancestor
Sequence homology, biological homology between DNA, RNA, or protein sequences
Homologous chromosomes, chromosomes in a biological cell that pair up (synapse) during meiosis
Homologous recombination, genetic recombination in which nucleotide sequences are exchanged between molecules of DNA
Homologous desensitization, a receptor decreases its response to a signalling molecule when that agonist is in high concentration
Homology modeling, a method of protein structure prediction

Chemistry 

Homology (chemistry), the relationship between compounds in a homologous series
Homologous series, a series of organic compounds having different quantities of a repeated unit
Homologous temperature, the temperature of a material as a fraction of its absolute melting point
Homologation reaction,  a chemical reaction which produces the next logical member of a homologous series

Other sciences 

Homology (anthropology), analogy between human beliefs, practices or artifacts owing to genetic or historical connections
Homology (psychology), behavioral characteristics that have common origins in either evolution or development
Homologous behaviors, behaviors typical of species that share a common ancestor that was characterized by that behavior OR behaviors in an individual that share common origins in development
Homology (sociology), a structural resonance between the different elements making up a socio-cultural whole

Mathematics 

Homology (mathematics), a procedure to associate a sequence of abelian groups or modules with a given mathematical object
Homological algebra, a branch of mathematics

Other uses 

Homologation, from the ancient Greek "to agree", to indicate the approval of a sanctioning body
Homologation (motorsport), the process in motorsports where the sanctioning body approves a racing model for official use
Homological word, a word expressing a property which it possesses itself

See also 

 Homological dimension (disambiguation)